Tobit may refer to 

 The Book of Tobit, a book of scripture that is part of the Catholic and Orthodox biblical canon, or its principal character
 Tobit model, an econometric model for censored endogenous variables proposed by James Tobin
 Tobit Raphael, American  actor
 TBJZL, real name Tobit Brown (born 1993), English YouTuber

See also
Tobitt